José Ignacio Paua (29 April 1872–24 May 1926) was a Chinese-Filipino general who joined the Katipunan, a secret society that spearheaded the 1896 Philippine Revolution against the Spanish Empire. He later served in the Philippine Revolutionary Army under General Emilio Aguinaldo, the first Philippine president.

Biography
José Ignacio Paua was born to Chinese parents in Nan'an, Quanzhou, Southern Fujian, Qing China on April 29, 1872. And in 1890, he went to the Philippines with his uncle to seek his fortune and became a blacksmith's apprentice in Binondo, Manila. 

During the Philippine Revolution, he repaired lantaka cannons and other weapons. Near to the closing days of the revolution, he later served in the Philippine Revolutionary Army under Philippine President Emilio Aguinaldo.

On April 25, 1897, he also led the capture of Andres Bonifacio and Procopio Bonifacio under orders of President Aguinaldo along with Agapito Bonzón. Paua has been said to be the one who stabbed Andres Bonifacio in the neck during his arrest.

When the revolution ended, Paua began to fight against the Americans during the Philippine–American War and on September 26, 1898, he became a full general. When the war ended, he married a Filipino girl and they settled in Albay. He died of cancer on May 24, 1926 in Manila at the age of 54.

In popular culture
Paua was portrayed by Danilo Montes in the 1956 film Heneral Paua, directed by Felix Villar.

References

1872 births
1926 deaths
Chinese emigrants to the Philippines
Filipino people of Chinese descent
Generals from Fujian
Katipunan members